Pat Jalland  (born 1941) is an Australian historian. She is emeritus professor of history in the Research School of Social Sciences at the Australian National University.

Early life and education 
Patricia Case was born in Manchester, England on 18 August 1941. She graduated from the University of Bristol with a BA in 1963. She studied for her teaching qualification at Kings College, London in 1964. She completed a MA (1969) and PhD (1976) at the University of Toronto.

Career 
Jalland joined the Research School of Social Sciences at the Australian National University in 1983 and was promoted to professor of history in 1997. Following her retirement, she was appointed emeritus professor in 2013.

Jalland was elected a Fellow of the Royal Historical Society in 1981 and Fellow of the Academy of the Social Sciences in Australia in 1998.

Selected works

References 

1941 births
Living people
University of Toronto alumni
Academic staff of the Australian National University
Fellows of the Academy of the Social Sciences in Australia
Australian women historians